Richard Hopkins (1728?–1799), of Oving, Buckinghamshire, was an English politician.

He was the eldest son of Edward Hopkins of Coventry, whom he succeeded in 1736, and was educated at Lincoln's Inn (1739) and Queens' College, Cambridge (1746).

He was a Member of Parliament (MP) for Dartmouth on 7 February 1766 – 1780 and 1784–1790; for Thetford in 1780–1784; for Queenborough in 1790–1796; and for Harwich in 1796 – 19 March 1799.

He was a Clerk of the Green Cloth (1767–1777), a Lord of the Admiralty (1782–1783 and 1784–1791) and a Lord of the Treasury (1791–1797).

He died unmarried on 18 March 1799 and was buried in the Parish Church of St. Michael, Coventry, as were his parents and paternal grandparents. The church contained plaques commemorating these family members, and flat stones marked their burial places. As Coventry Cathedral, the church was destroyed during World War II.

References

1728 births
1799 deaths
People from Buckinghamshire
Members of Lincoln's Inn
Alumni of Queens' College, Cambridge
Members of the Parliament of Great Britain for Dartmouth
Members of the Parliament of Great Britain for Thetford
Members of the Parliament of Great Britain for Queenborough
Members of the Parliament of Great Britain for Harwich
British MPs 1761–1768
British MPs 1768–1774
British MPs 1774–1780
British MPs 1780–1784
British MPs 1784–1790
British MPs 1790–1796
British MPs 1796–1800
Lords of the Admiralty